Salem is a small community in the Canadian province of Nova Scotia, located near Amherst.

References
Salem, Nova Scotia

Communities in Cumberland County, Nova Scotia